Linn Creek (also known as Linn Branch) is a stream in Clark County in the U.S. state of Missouri. It is a tributary of the Fox River.

Linn Creek was named for the linden timber along its course.

See also
List of rivers of Missouri

References

Rivers of Clark County, Missouri
Rivers of Missouri